"Stay Fly" is the first single from hip hop group Three 6 Mafia's 2005 album Most Known Unknown. The song peaked at number 13 on the Billboard Hot 100 to become the group's biggest hit. The track, which samples "Tell Me Why Has Our Love Turned Cold" by Willie Hutch, features fellow Memphis rap duo 8Ball & MJG and Young Buck, a member of G-Unit. The single helped propel Most Known Unknown to RIAA platinum status. The single itself achieved 2x multi-platinum (double platinum) RIAA certification status on December 11, 2006.

Music video
The video features an appearance from newly recruited G-Unit member Spider Loc. Remix featured Southern rappers such as Slim Thug, Trick Daddy and Three 6 Mafia affiliate Project Pat (Juicy J, DJ Paul & Crunchy Black all return with new verses). The "Bay Area Remix" features E-40. The screwed and chopped version (done by Michael 5000 Watts) features part of the instrumental of "P*ssy Got Ya Hooked".

Controversy
Three six mafia has rapped about the devil before, just listening to Mystic Stylez proves that. In part of that, it led a common misconception that the sample of Willie Hutch's "Tell Me Why Has Our Love Turned Cold" actually said "lu-ci-fer, you're my king, You're my fath-ah"  While it can be heard as a homophone it isn't the beat said.

Charts

Weekly charts

Year-end charts

Certifications

References

External links

2005 singles
2005 songs
Three 6 Mafia songs
Young Buck songs
Songs about cannabis
Songs written by Juicy J
Songs written by DJ Paul
Songs written by Young Buck
Songs written by Willie Hutch